Sinopterus (meaning "Chinese wing") was a genus of tapejarid pterodactyloid pterosaur from the Aptian-age Lower Cretaceous Jiufotang Formation of Chaoyang, Liaoning, China. It was first described and named by Wang Xiaolin and Zhou Zhonghe. Three species have been classified in this genus, though only two are generally considered to be valid. Sinopterus is known for its proportionally large skull, which has a birdlike pointed beak, a long bony crest that starts with a tall premaxilla and goes back along the middle of the skull to form a point overhanging the rear of the skull, and its lack of teeth.

Description
 
The type species, S. dongi, is based on IVPP V13363, an articulated, nearly complete skeleton. The skull of this individual was 17 centimeters (6.7 inches) long, and the wingspan was estimated to be 1.2 meters (3.9 feet). The authors suggested that it was an omnivore, and noted that it was the first record of a tapejarid outside of Brazil, and the earliest and most complete tapejarid.

Classification
 
Sinopterus is known from numerous specimens, some of which have been assigned to unique species and even different genera over the years. The type species, Sinopterus dongi, is known from one specimen described in 2003. A second specimen, BPV-077, was also described in 2003 by Li, Lü, and Zhang, who classified it in its own species, S. gui. It was said to differ from S. dongi mainly in its smaller size (only about half the size of S. dongi) and the presence of a notarium, though this was later disproved. Some later studies found S. gui to simply represent a younger specimen of S. dongi, though one large analysis in 2014 found it to be a more primitive tapejarid.

A third specimen was referred to Sinopterus in 2007, again classified as a new species, this time given the name S. jii. This species was first named by Lü & Yuan in 2005 as the type species of a new genus which they named Huaxiapterus. Two later studies in 2007 and 2011 both showed that H. jii was in fact more closely related to Sinopterus than to the two other species also assigned to Huaxiapterus, "H." corollatus and "H." benxiensis. Both groups of researchers concluded that Huaxiapterus jii should therefore be reclassified as Sinopterus jii, and that the other two species of "Huaxiapterus" require a new genus name. However, a more complete phylogenetic analysis suggested that Sinopterus may actually be an intermediate step in the grade between H. jii and the other two Huaxiapterus species, making Sinopterus paraphyletic if H. jii is included.

In 2016, another species, S. lingyuanensis, was named. It purportedly differed from the other species in the proportions of its nasoantorbital fenestra, its rostral index, the relative sizes of its femur and tibia, and the relative sizes of the first and second wing digits. In the same paper describing this species, the species Huaxiapterus atavismus was also named. However, Xinjun Zhang and colleagues in 2019 considered Huaxiapterus an invalid genus and therefore reassigned H. atavismus to Sinopterus, which created the new combination Sinopterus atavismus.

A 2021 study by Darren Naish and colleagues of variation within pterosaur growth stages noted that numerous species had been classified as Sinopterus or "Huaxiapterus", most based only on a single specimen, and most differentiated from each other by features like wing proportions, skull length, and crest shape and size. Naish et al. pointed out that all of these features are known to be variable within a single species due to growth, and that there were unlikely to be such a high diversity of extremely similar species in the same ecosystem when their differences are more likely due to variation within a few species. They suggested that a larger study would be needed to untangle the question of how many species of Sinopterus-like pterosaurs actually existed in the Jiufotang ecosystem, and how they are related to each other. In a preliminary opinion, these scientists stated that there is likely only one valid species of Sinopterus, S. dongi, but that "Huaxiapterus" corollatus might be a valid second species based on unique wing and leg proportions. Their opinions are confirmed by a ressessment of Chinese tapejarids by Pêgas et al. in 2023, who also name the new genus Huaxiadraco for "Huaxiapterus" corollatus.

Relationships
 
The cladogram below follows the 2014 analysis by Brian Andres and colleagues, showing the placement of two Sinopterus species ("S." gui and S. dongi) within the clade Tapejaromorpha.

 
In 2019, a different analysis, this time by Alexander Kellner and colleagues, had recovered Sinopterus within the Tapejarinae, a subfamily within the larger group Tapejaridae, sister taxon to both Eopteranodon and Huaxiapterus. The cladogram of their analysis is shown below:

Paleobiology

Growth
 
Sinopterus is known from several specimens at various stages of growth, which has allowed scientists to study the changes these animals went through during their life histories.

At least one very small juvenile (possibly hatchling) specimen has been attributed to Sinopterus. This specimen was originally classified as a distinct genus in 2008, Nemicolopterus crypticus. The name Nemicolopterus comes from the Greek words "Nemos" meaning "forest", "ikolos" meaning "dweller", and the Latinised "pteron" meaning "wing". The specific name crypticus is derived from the Greek "kryptos", meaning "hidden". Thus "Nemicolopterus crypticus" means "Hidden flying forest dweller". The type specimen of N. crypticus, catalog number IVPP V-14377, is housed in the collection of the Institute of Vertebrate Paleontology and Paleoanthropology in Beijing, China. The fossil was collected from the Jiufotang Formation, like all adult Sinopterus specimens. It was discovered in the Luzhhouou locality of Yaolugou Town, Jianchang County, Huludao City, western Liaoning Province in northeastern China. It has a wingspan of slightly under 25 centimeters (10 in), making it smaller than all but a few specimens of hatchling pterosaurs. Wang et al. (2008), who originally described the specimen, concluded that it was immature, citing the amount of bone fusion and the ossification of the toes, gastralia, and sternum as indicating that it was a sub-adult rather than a hatchling. However, Darren Naish argued on his popular weblog that, due to the hypothesis that pterosaurs were highly precocial, bone fusion and ossification could have occurred very early in life, and that Nemicolopterus might in fact be a hatchling Sinopterus. This identification was formally presented in 2021 study, which found that Nemicolopterus fit into a growth series as a young juvenile or hatchling Sinopterus hatchling. An analysis of pterosaur relationships by Andres and colleagues in 2014 found the specimen in a sister group relationship with "Sinopterus" gui.

Based on study of hatchling Sinopterus skeletons as well as comparison with hatchlings of other pterosaur species, Naish and colleagues (2021) found that the wing proportions and bone strength/flexibility of hatchlings were similar to adults, and concluded that Sinopterus was capable of powered flight very shortly after hatching. They found that while young juveniles would have been excellent gliders, they would not have been reliant on gliding alone as opposed to true flight. Juveniles also seem to have been more adapted to flight in closed environments, like dense forests, compared to adults. Juveniles therefore probably occupied different ecological niches than adults, transitioning between different niches as they grew.

See also
 List of pterosaur genera
 Timeline of pterosaur research

References

Tapejaromorphs
Early Cretaceous pterosaurs of Asia
Jiufotang fauna
Fossil taxa described in 2003
Taxa named by Zhou Zhonghe